Kommer is a surname. Notable people with the name include:

Asso Kommer (born 1966), Estonian soldier and politician
Nick Kommer (born 1990), Australian rules footballer

See also
Kommer Damen, Dutch businessman
Kummer, a surname
Commer, British vehicle manufacturing company